Margate Salmestone was a ward of Margate Municipal District prior to 1973. When the Municipal District was included in the Thanet Borough in 1974, Salmestone ward elected 3 councillors to the new Borough, but following the boundary changes of 1979 this was reduced to two councillors.

Elections

1973 Election

1976 Election

1979 Election

1983 Election

1987 Election

1991 Election

3,736	38.5%	1,438

1995 Election

1999 Election

3,657	23.3%	852

2003 Election

2007 Election

Margate